In ecology, a biological interaction is the effect that a pair of organisms living together in a community have on each other. They can be either of the same species (intraspecific interactions), or of different species (interspecific interactions). These effects may be short-term, or long-term, both often strongly influence the adaptation and  evolution of the species involved. Biological interactions range from mutualism, beneficial to both partners, to competition, harmful to both partners. Interactions can be direct when physical contact is established or indirect, through intermediaries such as shared resources, territories, ecological services, metabolic waste, toxins or growth inhibitors. This type of relationship can be shown by net effect based on individual effects on both organisms arising out of relationship.

Several recent studies have suggested non-trophic species interactions such as habitat modification and mutualisms can be important determinants of food web structures. However, it remains unclear whether these findings generalize across ecosystems, and whether non-trophic interactions affect food webs randomly, or affect specific trophic levels or functional groups.

History
Although biological interactions, more or less individually, were studied earlier, Edward Haskell (1949) gave an integrative approach to the thematic, proposing a classification of "co-actions", later adopted by biologists as "interactions". Close and long-term interactions are described as symbiosis; symbioses that are mutually beneficial are called mutualistic.

The term symbiosis was subject to a century-long debate about whether it should specifically denote mutualism, as in lichens or in parasites that benefit themselves. This debate created two different classifications for biotic interactions, one based on the time (long-term and short-term interactions), and other based on the magnitud of interaction force (competition/mutualism) or effect of individual fitness, according the stress gradient hypothesis and Mutualism Parasitism Continuum. Evolutionary game theory such as Red Queen Hypothesis, Red King Hypthesis or Black Queen Hypothesis, have demonstrated a classification based on the force of interaction is important.

Classification based on time of interaction

Short-term interactions 

Short-term interactions, including predation and pollination, are extremely important in ecology and evolution. These are short-lived in terms of the duration of a single interaction: a predator kills and eats a prey; a pollinator transfers pollen from one flower to another; but they are extremely durable in terms of their influence on the evolution of both partners. As a result, the partners coevolve.

Predation 

In predation, one organism, the predator, kills and eats another organism, its prey. Predators are adapted and often highly specialized for hunting, with acute senses such as vision, hearing, or smell. Many predatory animals, both vertebrate and invertebrate, have sharp claws or jaws to grip, kill, and cut up their prey. Other adaptations include stealth and aggressive mimicry that improve hunting efficiency. Predation has a powerful selective effect on prey, causing them to develop antipredator adaptations such as warning coloration, alarm calls and other signals, camouflage and defensive spines and chemicals. Predation has been a major driver of evolution since at least the Cambrian period.

Over the last several decades, microbiologists have discovered a number of fascinating microbes that survive by their ability to prey upon others. Several of the best examples are members of the genera Daptobacter (Campylobacterota), Bdellovibrio, and Vampirococcus.

Bdellovibrios are active hunters that are vigorously motile, swimming about looking for susceptible Gram-negative bacterial prey. Upon sensing such a cell, a bdellovibrio cell swims faster until it collides with the prey cell. It then bores a hole through the outer membrane of its prey and enters the periplasmic space. As it grows, it forms a long filament that eventually forms septae and produces progeny bacteria. Lysis of the prey cell releases new bdellovibrio cells. Bdellovibrios will not attack mammalian cells, and Gram-negative prey bacteria have never been observed to acquire resistance to bdellovibrios.

This has raised interest in the use of these bacteria as a "probiotic" to treat infected wounds. Although this has not yet been tried, one can imagine that with the rise in antibiotic-resistant pathogens, such forms of treatments may be considered viable alternatives.

Pollination 

In pollination, pollinators including insects (entomophily), some birds (ornithophily), and some bats, transfer pollen from a male flower part to a female flower part, enabling fertilisation, in return for a reward of pollen or nectar. The partners have coevolved through geological time; in the case of insects and flowering plants, the coevolution has continued for over 100 million years. Insect-pollinated flowers are adapted with shaped structures, bright colours, patterns, scent, nectar, and sticky pollen to attract insects, guide them to pick up and deposit pollen, and reward them for the service. Pollinator insects like bees are adapted to detect flowers by colour, pattern, and scent, to collect and transport pollen (such as with bristles shaped to form pollen baskets on their hind legs), and to collect and process nectar (in the case of honey bees, making and storing honey). The adaptations on each side of the interaction match the adaptations on the other side, and have been shaped by natural selection on their effectiveness of pollination.

Seed dispersal 

Seed dispersal is the movement, spread or transport of seeds away from the parent plant. Plants have limited mobility and rely upon a variety of dispersal vectors to transport their propagules, including both abiotic vectors such as the wind and living (biotic) vectors like birds. Seeds can be dispersed away from the parent plant individually or collectively, as well as dispersed in both space and time. The patterns of seed dispersal are determined in large part by the dispersal mechanism and this has important implications for the demographic and genetic structure of plant populations, as well as migration patterns and species interactions. There are five main modes of seed dispersal: gravity, wind, ballistic, water, and by animals. Some plants are serotinous and only disperse their seeds in response to an environmental stimulus. Dispersal involves the letting go or detachment of a diaspore from the main parent plant.

Long-term interactions (Symbiosis) 

The six possible types of symbiosis are mutualism, commensalism, parasitism, neutralism, amensalism, and competition. These are distinguished by the degree of benefit or harm they cause to each partner.

Mutualism 

Mutualism is an interaction between two or more species, where species derive a mutual benefit, for example an increased carrying capacity. Similar interactions within a species are known as co-operation. Mutualism may be classified in terms of the closeness of association, the closest being symbiosis, which is often confused with mutualism. One or both species involved in the interaction may be obligate, meaning they cannot survive in the short or long term without the other species. Though mutualism has historically received less attention than other interactions such as predation, it is an important subject in ecology. Examples include cleaning symbiosis, gut flora, Müllerian mimicry, and nitrogen fixation by bacteria in the root nodules of legumes.

Commensalism 

Commensalism benefits one organism and the other organism is neither benefited nor harmed. It occurs when one organism takes benefits by interacting with another organism by which the host organism is not affected. A good example is a remora living with a manatee. Remoras feed on the manatee's faeces. The manatee is not affected by this interaction, as the remora does not deplete the manatee's resources.

Parasitism 

Parasitism is a relationship between species, where one organism, the parasite, lives on or in another organism, the host, causing it some harm, and is adapted structurally to this way of life. The parasite either feeds on the host, or, in the case of intestinal parasites, consumes some of its food.

Neutralism 
Neutralism (a term introduced by Eugene Odum) describes the relationship between two species that interact but do not affect each other. Examples of true neutralism are virtually impossible to prove; the term is in practice used to describe situations where interactions are negligible or insignificant.

Amensalism 

Amensalism (a term introduced by Haskell) is an interaction where an organism inflicts harm to another organism without any costs or benefits received by itself.  Amensalism describes the adverse effect that one organism has on another organism (figure 32.1). This is a unidirectional process based on the release of a specific compound by one organism that has a negative effect on another. A classic example of amensalism is the microbial production of antibiotics that can inhibit or kill other, susceptible microorganisms.

A clear case of amensalism is where sheep or cattle trample grass. Whilst the presence of the grass causes negligible detrimental effects to the animal's hoof, the grass suffers from being crushed. Amensalism is often used to describe strongly asymmetrical competitive interactions, such as has been observed between the Spanish ibex and weevils of the genus Timarcha which feed upon the same type of shrub. Whilst the presence of the weevil has almost no influence on food availability, the presence of ibex has an enormous detrimental effect on weevil numbers, as they consume significant quantities of plant matter and incidentally ingest the weevils upon it.

Amensalisms can be quite complex. Attine ants (ants belonging to a New World tribe) are able to take advantage of an interaction between an actinomycete and a parasitic fungus in the genus Escovopsis. This amensalistic relationship enables the ant to maintain a mutualism with members of another fungal genus, Leucocoprinus. Amazingly, these ants cultivate a garden of Leucocoprinus fungi for their own nourishment. To prevent the parasitic fungus Escovopsis from decimating their fungal garden, the ants also promote the growth of an actinomycete of the genus Pseudonocardia, which produces an antimicrobial compound that inhibits the growth of the Escovopsis fungi.

Competition 

Competition can be defined as an interaction between organisms or species, in which the fitness of one is lowered by the presence of another. Competition is often for a resource such as food, water, or territory in limited supply, or for access to females for reproduction. Competition among members of the same species is known as intraspecific competition, while competition between individuals of different species is known as interspecific competition. According to the competitive exclusion principle, species less suited to compete for resources should either adapt or die out. According to evolutionary theory, this competition within and between species for resources plays a critical role in natural selection.

Classification based on effect on fitness 
Biotic interactions can vary in intensity (strength of interaction), and frequency (number of interactions in a given time). There are direct interactions when there is a physical contact between individuals or indirect interactions when there is no physical contact, that is, the interaction occurs with a resource, eclogical service, toxine or growth inhibitor. The interactions can be directly determined by individuals (incidentally) or by stochastic processes (accidentally), for instance side effects that one individual have on other. They are divided into 6 major types: Competition, Antagonism, Amensalism, Neutralism, Commensalism and Mutualism.

Competition 
It is when two organisms fight and both reduce their fitness. An incidental dysbiosis (determined by organisms) is observed. It could be direct competition, when two organisms fight physically and both end up affected. Include interference competition. Indirect competition is when two organisms fight indirectly for a resource or service and both end up affected. It includes exploitation competition, competitive exclusion and apparent exploitation competition. Competition is related to Red Queen Hypothesis.

Antagonism 
It is when one organism takes advantage of another, one increases its fitness and the other decreases it. An incidental antibiosis (determined by chance) is observed. Direct antagonism is when an organism benefits by directly harming, partially or totally consuming another organism. Includes predation, grazing, browsing, and parasitism. Indirect antagonism is when one organism benefits by harming or consuming the resources or ecological services of another organism. Includes allelopathic antagonism, metabolic antagonism, resource exploitation.

Amensalism 
It is when one organism maintains its fitness, but the fitness of another decreases. Accidental antibiosis (determined by chance) is observed. Direct amensalism is when one organism physically inhibits the presence of another, but the latter is neither benefited nor harmed. Includes accidental crushing. (e.g., crushing an ant does not increase or decrease fitness of the crusher). Indirect amensalism is when an organism accidentally inhibits the presence of another with chemical substances (inhibitors) or waste. Includes accidental antibiosis, accidental poisoning and accidental allelopathy.

Neutralism 
It is when two organisms accidentally coexist, but they do not benefit or harm each other physically or through resources or services, there is no change in the fitness for both.

Commensalism 
It is when one organism maintains its  fitness, but the  fitness of another increases. Accidental probiosis (determined by chance) is observed. Direct comensalism is when an organism physically benefits another organism without harming or benefiting it. Includes facilitation, epibiosis, and phoresis. Indirect comensalism is when an organism benefits from the resource or service of another without affecting or benefiting it. Includes tanatochresis, inquiliny, detrivory, scavenging, coprophagy.

Mutualism 
When two organisms cooperate and both increase their fitness. Incidental probiosis (determined by organisms) is observed. It is subdivided into. Direct mutualism is when two organisms physically cooperate and both benefit, it includes obligate symbiosis. Indirect mutualism is when two organisms cooperate to obtain a resource or service and both benefit. It includes facultative symbiosis, protocooperation, niche construction, metabolic syntrophy, holobiosis, mutual aid, and metabolic coupling. Mutualism is related to the Red King and Black Queen hypotheses.

Non-trophic interactions

Some examples of non-trophic interactions are habitat modification, mutualism and competition for space. It has been suggested recently that non-trophic interactions can indirectly affect food web topology and trophic dynamics by affecting the species in the network and the strength of trophic links. A number of recent theoretical studies have emphasized the need to integrate trophic and non-trophic interactions in ecological network analyses. The few empirical studies that address this suggest food web structures (network topologies) can be strongly influenced by species interactions outside the trophic network. However these studies include only a limited number of coastal systems, and it remains unclear to what extent these findings can be generalized. Whether non-trophic interactions typically affect specific species, trophic levels, or functional groups within the food web, or, alternatively, indiscriminately mediate species and their trophic interactions throughout the network has yet to be resolved. Some studies suggest sessile species with generally low trophic levels seem to benefit more than others from non-trophic facilitation, while other studies suggest facilitation benefits higher trophic and more mobile species as well.

A 2018 study by Borst et al.. tested the general hypothesis that foundation species — spatially dominant habitat-structuring organisms  – modify food webs by enhancing their size as indicated by species number, and their complexity as indicated by link density, via facilitation of species, regardless of ecosystem type (see diagram). Additionally, they tested that any change in food web properties caused by foundation species occurs via random facilitation of species throughout the entire food web or via targeted facilitation of specific species that belong to certain trophic levels or functional groups. It was found that species at the base of the food web are less strongly, and carnivores are more strongly facilitated in foundation species' food webs than predicted based on random facilitation, resulting in a higher mean trophic level and a longer average chain length. This indicates foundation species strongly enhance food web complexity through non-trophic facilitation of species across the entire trophic network.

Although foundation species are part of the food web like any other species (e.g. as prey or predator), numerous studies have shown that they strongly facilitate the associated community by creating new habitat and alleviating physical stress. This form of non-trophic facilitation by foundation species has been found to occur across a wide range of ecosystems and environmental conditions. In harsh coastal zones, corals, kelps, mussels, oysters, seagrasses, mangroves, and salt marsh plants facilitate organisms by attenuating currents and waves, providing aboveground structure for shelter and attachment, concentrating nutrients, and/or reducing desiccation stress during low tide exposure. In more benign systems, foundation species such as the trees in a forest, shrubs and grasses in savannahs, and macrophytes in freshwater systems, have also been found to play a major habitat-structuring role. Ultimately, all foundation species increase habitat complexity and availability, thereby partitioning and enhancing the niche space available to other species.

See also

 Altruism (biology)
 Animal sexual behaviour
 Biological pump – interaction between marine animals and carbon forms
 Cheating (biology)
 Collective animal behavior
 Detritivory
 Epibiont
 Food chain
 Kin selection
 Microbial cooperation
 Microbial loop
 Quorum sensing
 Spite (game theory)
 Swarm behaviour

Notes

References

Further reading

 Snow, B. K. & Snow, D. W. (1988). Birds and berries: a study of an ecological interaction. Poyser, London 

 
Ecology